Phallocryptus spinosus, the halophilic fairy shrimp, is a species of fairy shrimp within the family Thamnocephalidae. The species of previously recorded from a shallow salty pond in Tabriz, occurring in the same area as Branchinecta orientalis. More locations were reported in similar habitats in central and south Iran from Bafq and Lar, and a 4th population was found 200 kilometers south to the original locality.

References 

Crustaceans described in 1840
Arthropods of Iran
Anostraca